Johannes Raudmets (also known as Ivan Ivanovich Raudmets; January 1, 1892 – September 9, 1937) was an Estonian Soviet Komdiv (division commander). He fought in the Imperial Russian Army in World War I before going over to the Bolsheviks in the subsequent civil war. He was a recipient of the Order of the Red Banner. During the Great Purge, he was arrested on June 11, 1937 and later executed. Some sources give the date of his execution as August 25, 1937. After the death of Joseph Stalin, he was rehabilitated in 1966.

References

Bibliography
 Гражданская война и военная интервенция в СССР. Энциклопедический справочник, - М., "Советская энциклопедия", 1983.
 Великий Жовтень i громадянська вiйна на Україні. - К., Головна редакція УРЕ, 1987.
 Энциклопедический словарь «Николаевцы, 1789-1999 г.г.», г.Николаев, «Возможности Киммерии», 1999.

External links
Olev Kenk "Paides teisaldati nõukogudeaegne monument". ERR uudised. 23.02.2007
Раудмец Иван Иванович (1892–1937.09.09)

1892 births
1937 deaths
People from Peipsiääre Parish
People from the Governorate of Estonia
Soviet komdivs
Recipients of the Order of the Red Banner
Russian military personnel of World War I
Soviet military personnel of the Russian Civil War
Great Purge victims from Estonia
People executed by the Soviet Union
Soviet rehabilitations